Rome International School (RIS) is a private international school in Rome, Italy. The school offers an international education to children aged 2 to 18 years, from Nursery through to Grade 13. The language of instruction is English. RIS is an International Baccalaureate School offering the Primary Years Programme in the Elementary School and the IB Diploma Programme in the last two years of High School. Students in Grade 10 and 11 sit the IGCSE International General Certificate of Secondary Education, as administered by Cambridge University.

History
RIS opened its doors to its first Elementary School students in September 1988. The Middle School opened in September 2001 and the High School was launched in 2007. RIS was authorized to deliver the International Baccalaureate Diploma Programme in June 2009.

Organisation
In 2018 Rome International School was integrated into the Globeducate network (formerly known as NACE Schools).

Curriculum
RIS has been an International Baccalaureate World School since June 2009.

In July 2012, Rome International School received authorization from the IB governing body in The Hague, The Netherlands, to offer the IBO Primary Years Programme (PYP).

RIS is a meritocratic school: advancement is based on individual ability and achievement. Admission to the school is selective, subject to interview, entrance tests and reports from previous schools, and there are scholarships available for worthy international students.

Early Years Department
The Nursery accepts children ages 2 and up.

The curriculum of the Kindergarten  consists of programmes incorporating Language and Literacy, Mathematics, Personal, Social and Emotional Development, Physical Development, The Arts (drama, music, visual arts), and Units of Inquiry; these provide a trans-disciplinary approach to the teaching of Science and Technology and Social Studies and may incorporate Language and Mathematics and other subject areas where appropriate.

Transition class pupils continue working towards clearly defined learning targets, building on the work done in Kindergarten.

Elementary school
The International Baccalaureate Primary Years Programme (IB PYP) is a transdisciplinary programme for children from 3 to 12 years of age. The PYP encourages children to take responsibility for their own learning and build their skills to become lifelong learners.

The PYP is transdisciplinary meaning students investigate big ideas supported and enriched by the traditional subject areas. The IB is committed to making sure that students in IB programmes meet and exceed local or national standards.

Students at Rome International School are instructed, in a transdisciplinary way, in the following subjects:

English
Italian
Mathematics
Science
History
Geography
The Arts: 
Drama
Music
Visual Arts
PSPE (Personal, Social and Physical Education)
Music
ICT
Science
History and Geography (Social Studies)

Middle school
The school is not pursuing full implementation of the IB Middle Years Programme, however many of the fundamental concepts of the MYP are included in the Middle Years curriculum with the aim of developing the qualities of the IB Learner Profile.

The Middle School programme is a stimulating and varied curriculum that seeks to develop and enrich the learning skills formed in the Primary Programme. It draws learning material from a wide range of global contexts and the range of learning resources available for Cambridge Secondary Education.

During the academic year 2015/16, the school introduced Cambridge Checkpoint for students in Grade 9, a diagnostic tool designed to assess learners at the end of the Middle Years.

The school offers a choice of French, Spanish or Chinese languages and also offers students the opportunity to follow an Italian curriculum to coincide with the international curriculum. At the end of Year 9 these students take the Italian state Licenza Media examinations.

High school
Grade 10 and 11 students follow the International General Certificate of Secondary Education (IGCSE) examinations at the end of Grade 11. Successful applicants can then enter the pre-university two year IB Diploma Programme.

Location and facilities
In July 2014, Rome International School re-located to a new campus in Via Guglielmo Pecori Giraldi, 137 (near Via della Camilluccia). The campus is situated in a natural park of over 3.5 hectares and has a covered surface area of around 9,000 square metres. It features a 230-seat auditorium, two gyms, a cross-country running track, large external sports grounds, ample recreational and study areas.

Scholarships
As from the academic year 2010/2011, RIS has a Scholarship Fund Programme. This programme is intended to promote the growth of the school’s international community and to give promising non-Italian students, whose families lack sufficient financial resources, a chance to have a high-quality international education.

References

International Baccalaureate schools in Italy
Private schools in Italy
International schools in Rome
Secondary schools in Italy